Nasim Khaksar is an Iranian writer who fled Iran to live in the Netherlands.

Biography 
Nasim Khaksar was born on January 1, 1944, the southern city of Abadan. Upon receiving his teaching certification from colleges in Esfahan and Hamadan, he taught in villages in the Abadan and Boyer-Ahmad County of southern Iran until his arrest for political activity in 1968. 

He served two prison terms amounting to 8 years.
Khaksar began writing fiction in 1966. He writes short stories, novels, plays, poetry, criticism, and travel literature. Among his works, are two collections of his short stories, The Grocer of Kharzeville and Between Two Doors, both of which have been translated and published in Dutch as well as his novel Windmills and Lashes. Also, collections of his plays, Under the Roof and an account of his travels to Tajikistan also translated and published in Dutch in the Netherlands. In addition to those, a number of his stories, plays and articles have been translated into German, English, French and Swedish.
Obliged to leave Iran after the revolution, Nasim Khaksar currently lives in the Netherlands. Since he began his life in exile, he has been an articulate voice for the experiences of millions Iranians who had to adjust to life in unfamiliar lands. He has been particularly adept at demonstrating the feelings of disassociation, loss of language, and the inability to express oneself and one's feelings that accompany the experience of exile.
Books published in Dutch
1-De Kruidenier van Kharzavil ( Verhalen) Story
2-Reis naar Tadzijkistan ( Reis Verhaal) Travel book
3-Weerhanen en Zeepslagen ( Roman)
4-Tussen twee deuren ( Verhalen) Story
5- Onder Dak, Sterren op aarde, De laatste Brief( Toneelteksten) Play

Bibliography

Books published in Iran
1970 Let us read together
1973 I know the children love for spring to come
1979 the Embryo collection of short stories
1979 if people would love each other
1980 The Bread and the Flower collection of short stories
1981 Tree, Road, Kid collection of poems.
1981 Steps to be taken. Novel
1982 The Little Intellectual. Collection of short stories.
1983 I Love Peace Story for Children

Books published in Europe
 1987 The Men of Yesterday Interrelated Stories
 1987 Three Plays
 1988 The Grocer of Kharzavil collection of short stories about exile  
 1988 The Love of Hadj Agha Collection of Short stories
 1989 The story of the winding alley and the four old women. Story for the children.
 1989 Elegy for a friend Collection of poems
 1989 The last letter . Play
 1990 The Cage of Jahan Khanom's Parot . Novel 
 1991 The Changing Voice . Collection of reviews, articles and lectures on art and literature.
 1994 Journey to Tajikistan . Travel journal 
 1996 Gazelles in the Snow . Collection of short stories. 
 2010 Zwischen zwei Türen: Geschichten aus der Diaspora 
 2012 Vanes and Whips: Badnama-Ha Va Shalagh-Ha (Persian Edition) . Novel 
 2012 Rising to the Sun: Faraz-e Masnad-e Khorshid (Persian Edition) 
 2015 Christina 
 2017 Arizona Road: Jaddeh-ye Arizona 
 PART TWO: The Road To Arizona. 
 2017 Little Intellectual: Roshanfekr-E Koochak

Other literary works
 The wedding for the dead doi:10.1080/03064229108535153
 
 Gām'hā-yi paymūdan / Nasīm Khāksār. 1982

References

External links
 Nasim khaksar in Dutch language, published in Ipoetryنسیم خاکسار بزبان هلندی که در نشریه هلندی " آی پوئتری" منتشر شده است
 Aida Netherlands News
 Nasim Khaksar- Google Books 
 گفتگو با نسیم خاکسار در سایت بی‌بی‌سی
 فراز مسند خورشید. نقد رمان نسیم خاکسار در رادیو زمانه
 نقد دیگری بر رمان نسیم خاکسار در رادیو زمانه
 درباره نسیم خاکسار در سایت گویا
 Song of Exile-illumina films
 رنگ و بوی تبعید در آثار نسیم خاکسار ۱۳۸۶-۰۳-۰۲ نویسنده سانی فرد- شهرزاد نیوز

This article is in Dutch language: Een verrot systeem baart verknipte mensen

Iranian writers
Living people
Iranian expatriates in the Netherlands
Iranian emigrants to the Netherlands
Iranian male short story writers
Year of birth missing (living people)